Užusaliai Eldership is a Lithuanian eldership, located in a western part of Jonava District Municipality. As of 2020, administrative centre and largest settlement within eldership was Užusaliai.

Populated places 
Following settlements are located in the Užusaliai Eldership (as for 2011 census):

Villages: Būdos II, Būdos III, Būdos IV, Būdos V, Daukliūnai, Didysis Raistas, Gireliai, Girininkai II, Guldynai, Išorai, Kalnėnai, Krėslynai, Kungušilai, Mikainiai, Naujatriobiai, Pabiržis, Pagojis, Paskutiškiai, Pašiliai, Sunkiniai, Svilonėliai, Sviloniai, Šafarka, Šešuva, Turžėnai, Užusaliai, Veseluvka

Demography

References

Elderships in Jonava District Municipality